This is a list of notable individuals born in Italy of Lebanese ancestry or people of Lebanese and Italian dual nationality who live or lived in Italy.

Entertainment
Bob Azzam, singer
Antonella Lualdi, actress

Sciences
Luca Turin, biophysicist

Sports
Bruno Carmeni, judoka

Writers
Gad Lerner, journalist

See also
Italian Lebanese
Italy–Lebanon relations
List of Lebanese people
List of Lebanese people (Diaspora)

Italy
Lebanese

Lebanese